Coldharbour Lane is a road in south London, England, that leads south-westwards from Camberwell to Brixton. Between the junctions of Coldharbour Lane and Denmark Hill in Camberwell SE5 and Coldharbour Lane and Denmark Road lies part of the boundary between Lambeth and Southwark boroughs. The other end of Coldharbour Lane meets Acre Lane in central Brixton to form the A2217.

The Loughborough Junction area, surrounding the railway station, marks the approximate centre point of Coldharbour Lane and the change in postcode from SE5 to SW9.

History
Coldharbour Lane was formerly known as Camberwell Lane.

Former British Prime Minister John Major lived in a flat at 144 Coldharbour Lane when a child from 1955 to 1959.

The lane close by Brixton Market became derelict by the mid-1960s, when many drug houses flourished dealing mainly in cannabis.

In 1981 the Brixton riots occurred in roads near Coldharbour Lane and some windows were broken on the street itself. With the support of community leaders and shop owners, plans were put in place to set up a mini-police station on Coldharbour Lane in the former premises of a drug dealer. Police Safer Neighborhoods Teams worked from number 411 with another base near Loughborough Junction at number 236. Both closed in 2019.

Origins of the name 
A possible derivation of the name is Cool Arbour Lane, dating from the time Camberwell was in the country. This is cited in 'The Streets' by Anthony Quinn (2012) as the place the Camberwell beauty was first sighted.

A "cold harbour" was an uninhabited shelter for travellers, often along a well-known route, somewhat similar to a modern bothy. Unlike an inn, there were no staff, food or drink to be had. There would be a roof, door and possibly a simple hearth, although it was the traveller's responsibility to gather fuel. They were generally little more than open-faced barns or animal shelters.

J. C. Hahn, in Notes and Queries Series 3, 7, 253–254 (1 April 1865) and later in Series 3, 8, 71–72 (22 July 1865) wrote an article entitled "Remarks on the Origin of 'Cold Harbour'".

In this, the author remarks upon relatively early equivalent place names in Germany and traces back the origins of Coldharbour/Cold Harbour to the Old High German Kalte Herberge. There is a village in Germany and another in Austria called Kaltherberg. This etymology was accepted by the authors of the dictionary Merriam-Webster. Our author concludes that "our Cold Harbour was a name given to any cold abode, cold retreat, brought over to England by our Saxon ancestors—Cold Harbour = Cold Station, Cold House, Cold Lodge." And thus has a wider meaning than that attributed by the supporters of a basic type of lodgings.

"Coldharbour" also survives as the name of a village in Surrey, and Bristol has both a "Coldharbour Road" and a "Cold Harbour Lane".

Coldharbour Lane also gives its name to Coldharbour ward in Brixton although approximately one third of Coldharbour Lane is located in Herne Hill ward.

Crime

April 1997 shooting
In April 1997, Devon Dawson, a 29-year-old Jamaican in the UK with a six-month visa, was shot dead with a sub-machine gun outside the Green Man pub on Coldharbour Lane.

June 1997 shooting
On 3 June 1997, Anthony Baker was shot in the head during a raid at the Control Tower takeaway in Coldharbour Lane, Brixton, where he worked. The shooting happened just a few hundred yards from Lambeth Town Hall where, at the same time, Chief Inspector Alan O'Gorman was telling a packed meeting that gun crime in the area was becoming out of control.

2003 most dangerous street claim
In a 2003 article in the London Evening Standard, David Cohen described Coldharbour Lane as the most dangerous street in the most dangerous borough in London. The headline asked whether the street is 'the most dangerous in Britain'.

2018 graffiti artists hit by train
On 18 June 2018, three graffiti artists, aged between 19 and 23, died when they were hit by a train at Loughborough Junction station on Coldharbour Lane. A former Transport for London (TfL) board member, Brian Cooke, was criticised by social media users after he tweeted that the dead men were "common scum who cost the railway millions and keep fares high".

2014 Council Election

Coldharbour

- Rachel Heywood was elected as a Labour Councillor. Heywood resigned the party whip in April 2016 and now sits as an Independent councillor.

Pubs and bars
There are several pubs and bars on Coldharbour Lane: the Prince of Wales in Brixton  which has been on the same site since 1800; the Prince Albert which has occasional live music and quiz nights; the Dogstar, a "three-floor DJ bar"; Living; Club 414, and the Plough. The Green Man, the Angel, the Enterprise and the Hero (latterly the Junction) all ceased trading between 2000 and 2007 .

In popular culture
Brixton-based band Alabama 3 named their debut album Exile on Coldharbour Lane after the road. Although "Woke Up This Morning" on this album mentions Coldharbour Lane, the mention is omitted from the "Chosen One Mix", used as the theme song for The Sopranos.

"Coldharbour Lane" — with the hook "So long / I've done my time / Coldharbour Lane / Goodbye" — is a single from The Quireboys's 2001 This Is Rock'n'Roll release.

Markus Schulz named his own recording label "Coldharbour Recordings" in honour of the time when he lived in a flat in Coldharbour Lane.

The area features in the 2008 novel The Room Of Lost Things by Stella Duffy, set in a dry cleaners on Coldharbour Lane.

Oladipo Agboluaje set a play referencing the street in 2007 "The Christ of Coldharbour Lane", about the sudden reappearance of Jesus Christ in Brixton.

Parts of Honeytrap, a 2015 film directed by Rebecca Johnson and starring Jessica Sula, were filmed on the street.

The Camberwell beauty

The rare migrant butterfly, the Camberwell beauty (Nymphalis antiopa) was so named after the discovery of two specimens in Coldharbour Lane in 1748. The butterflies had probably arrived as stowaways on ships delivering timber from Scandinavia to the Surrey Docks two miles to the north.

References

 

Streets in the London Borough of Lambeth
Streets in the London Borough of Southwark
Camberwell
Brixton